
Leslie Cussons (13 January 1907 – 6 September 1963). Born in Swinton, near Salford, Lancashire, England to Alexander Tom Cussons (1875–1951) and his wife Emily Jane Cussons (née Kidd, 1875–1957). Leslie was the Chairman of Cussons Sons & Co, the largest independent soap manufacturer in Britain. Leslie continued manufacturing of the famous brand Cussons Imperial Leather.

Career
Leslie worked at the Cussons Company from 1924 until his death in 1963. In 1951 Leslie succeeded his father to become chairman of the Cussons Company. Leslie oversaw the acquisition of Gerard Bros. in 1955, and subsequently made extensive improvements to the Gerard Bros Nottingham factory. In 1957 Leslie also acquired the 1001 Carpet Cleaner brand, and made it into Britain's leading carpet cleaner.

In 1963 Leslie showed Prince Philip, Duke of Edinburgh around his factory in Kersal, Salford. Prince Philip was introduced to selected factory staff before unveiling a plaque in the entrance hall.

Interests
Leslie was keenly interested in agriculture, and owned large farms in Derbyshire and the Isle of Man

Leslie was also a tennis enthusiast, having reached the early rounds of Wimbledon, and was president of the Lancashire County Tennis Association.

Residence
Leslie resided at Hale Bank Farm in Altrincham Cheshire, near to Manchester Airport and Ballacotch Manor in the Isle of Man.

References

1907 births
1963 deaths
People from Swinton, Greater Manchester
20th-century English businesspeople